Susanna Hunt   (a.k.a. Susan Hunt, Sue Tacker) is an English pop singer, actress and model. She gained fame in the late 1960s and early 1970s.

Early life 
She was born in Brenchley, Kent, England, in a farming community family, and then lived in Sedlescombe, Sussex.

She later moved to London and signed up with the Cherry Marshall Model Agency, where she learned to sing, hoping to move into acting.

Career 
Her lasting contribution to theater was her three-year 1975 Grammy Award nominated role in the play Let My People Come. She was an original member of the cast who created an entirely new style of the explicitly nude Broadway musical. The director and actors created a unique new Broadway musical style and play, maintaining popularity over 40 years later. This was the first widely popular all-nude musical.

The performance was nominated for a Grammy Award in 1975 for Best Original Cast Album.

Film 
 Casino Royale (1967) - Hunt played one of the "Bond Girls" in a short sequence where she tries to seduce agent Terence Cooper who is training to resist the temptation of women counter agents from "SMERSH".  She appears as "Lorely",  wearing a white bikini and walks up to and gives agent Terrance a sultry kiss to test his reaction. He responds that he's trained to resist her charm and then judo tackles her to the ground.
 The Looking Glass War (1969) - She plays a short scene in a cafe, with a girlfriend, where the lead character "Leiser" says he would like to meet some women.
 The British TV series, Special Branch (1974), featured her in a couple of episodes where she had a small part as Craven's secretary.
 She played in the British TV series Hugh and I.

Musical career
Susanna was a pop singer known under the stage name of Geneveve, in 1966 releasing the songs, "Just a Whisper", "Summer Days", "Nothing in the World", and "Once" plus in 1967, "That Can't Be Bad" and "I Love Him, I Need Him".

Her songs got airplay on English radio stations as well as pirates Radio London (trice in the Fab 40)  and Radio 270.

Personal life 
She married musician Ronnie Lane, and was a part of The Faces musical entourage.

She appeared in the 2006 documentary film, The Passing Show, where she speaks about Lane and "The Faces". She resides in Walnut Creek, California, United States.

References 

Year of birth missing (living people)
Living people
People from Brenchley
English female models
English stage actresses
English film actresses
English women pop singers
People from Sedlescombe